Carlos Julio Flores Pérez (born 27 October 1980) is a Venezuelan former windsurfer, who specializes in Mistral and Neil Pryde RS:X classes. He represented his country Venezuela in two editions of the Summer Olympic Games (2004 and 2008), finishing in the top thirty respectively in two different sailboards. A member of Centro de Vela Ligera in Anzoategui, along with his younger brother and eventual two-time Olympian Daniel, Flores trained for the country's sailing federation under the tutelage of his personal coach Christian Larte.

Flores made his Olympic debut in Athens 2004, sailing in the men's Mistral class. There, he accumulated a net grade of 232 points to obtain a lowly twenty-fifth overall position from a 34-man fleet at the end of the eleven-race series.

At the 2008 Summer Olympics in Beijing, Flores qualified for his second Venezuelan team in the inaugural RS:X class. Building up to his Olympic selection, he finished eighteenth out of 50 windsurfers in the silver fleet to grab the last of the nine quota spots available at the class-associated Worlds seven months earlier in Auckland, New Zealand. Flores stormed out from behind to cross the top-fifteen mark on the final leg of the ten-race series, but it was not enough to put him through to the final, ending his Olympic quest in twenty-ninth overall with 232 net points.

Notes

References

External links
 
 
 
 

1980 births
Living people
Venezuelan male sailors (sport)
Venezuelan windsurfers
Olympic sailors of Venezuela
Sailors at the 2004 Summer Olympics – Mistral One Design
Sailors at the 2008 Summer Olympics – RS:X
People from Cumaná
20th-century Venezuelan people
21st-century Venezuelan people